A whispering gallery is usually a circular, hemispherical, elliptical or ellipsoidal enclosure, often beneath a dome or a vault, in which whispers can be heard clearly in other parts of the gallery. Such galleries can also be set up using two parabolic dishes. Sometimes the phenomenon is detected in caves.

Theory 

A whispering gallery is most simply constructed in the form of a circular wall, and allows whispered communication from any part of the internal side of the circumference to any other part. The sound is carried by waves, known as whispering-gallery waves, that travel around the circumference clinging to the walls, an effect that was discovered in the whispering gallery of St Paul's Cathedral in London. The extent to which the sound travels at St Paul's can also be judged by clapping in the gallery, which produces four echoes. Other historical examples are the Gol Gumbaz mausoleum in Bijapur,India and the Echo Wall of the Temple of Heaven in Beijing. A hemispherical enclosure will also guide whispering gallery waves. The waves carry the words so that others will be able to hear them from the opposite side of the gallery.

The gallery may also be in the form of an ellipse or ellipsoid, with an accessible point at each focus. In this case, when a visitor stands at one focus and whispers, the line of sound emanating from this focus reflects directly to the focus at the other end of the gallery, where the whispers may be heard. In a similar way, two large concave parabolic dishes, serving as acoustic mirrors, may be erected facing each other in a room or outdoors to serve as a whispering gallery, a common feature of science museums. Egg-shaped galleries, such as the Golghar Granary at Bankipore, and irregularly shaped smooth-walled galleries in the form of caves, such as the Ear of Dionysius in Syracuse, also exist.

Examples

India 

 The Gol Gumbaz in Bijapur, India.
 The Golghar Granary in Bankipore, India.
 The Victoria Memorial in Kolkata.

United Kingdom 

 St Paul's Cathedral in London is the place where whispering-gallery waves were first discovered by Lord Rayleigh .
 The library of Dollar Academy in Scotland.
 The entrance gallery of the Aston Webb Great Hall at the University of Birmingham.
 Hamilton Mausoleum in Hamilton, South Lanarkshire, Scotland.
 Gloucester Cathedral has a whispering gallery.
 The Berkeley Wetherspoons Bristol has a whispering gallery.

United States 

 The Battle House Hotel in Mobile, Alabama has a whispering arch in the front lobby
 Cincinnati Union Terminal rotunda
 The Elijah P. Lovejoy Monument in Alton, IL, dedicated to the martyred abolitionist.
 Grand Central Terminal in New York City: a landing amid the Oyster Bar ramps, in front of the Oyster Bar restaurant 
 The library inside Hammond Castle Museum in Gloucester, Massachusetts.
 The Mapparium at The Mary Baker Eddy Library in Boston, Massachusetts allows visitors to enter the interior of a reflecting surface forming a nearly complete sphere
 A whispering gallery can be found on the main floor of the Museum of Science and Industry (Chicago)
 Statuary Hall in the United States Capitol.
 Salt Lake Tabernacle in Salt Lake City, Utah
 The rotunda at San Francisco City Hall.
 Curved stone benches on either side of the Smith Memorial Arch in Fairmount Park, Philadelphia, Pennsylvania.
 Centennial fountain in front of Green Library at Stanford University in California.
 The rotunda of the Texas State Capitol and the Missouri State Capitol.
 Gates Circle, Buffalo, New York.
 The Whispering Arch in St. Louis Union Station
 Charles Stover Bench, Central Park, New York, New York  
 Waldo Hutchins Bench, Central Park, New York, New York
 Center of the Universe, Tulsa, Oklahoma

Other parts of the world 

 Barossa Reservoir, Williamstown, South Australia.
 Cathedral of Brasília in Brazil.
 Martello towers.
 The Echo Wall in the Temple of Heaven in Beijing.
 Masjed-e Imam in Esfahān, Iran.
 Basilica of St. John Lateran, Rome.
 Santa Maria del Fiore, Florence Cathedral
 The Church of the Holy Sepulcher, Jerusalem.
 Leaning Tower of Nevyansk, Sverdlovsk Oblast.
 Selimiye Mosque in Edirne, Turkey.
 St. Peter's Basilica in the Vatican City.
 Monument to the Negev Brigade in Beersheba, Israel.
 The Salle de Cariatides in the Louvre, Paris, France.
 The Treasury of Atreus, Greece
 Secret's Chamber in El Escorial in Madrid, Spain.
 The Whispering Gallery in the Alhambra in Granada, Spain.
 Cleopatra's Bath in the Siwa Oasis, Egypt.
 Ear of Dionysius cave in Syracuse, Sicily.
 Meštrović Pavilion in Zagreb, Croatia
 Royal BC Museum in Victoria, British Columbia, Canada
 Sacred Heart Cathedral, Wellington, New Zealand
 The Whispering Arch (Flüsterbogen) in Görlitz, Germany.
 Piazza Mercanti, Milan street
Whispering walls, Bologna, Italy

In science 

The term whispering gallery has been borrowed in the physical sciences to describe other forms of whispering-gallery waves such as light or matter waves.

See also 

 Acoustic mirror
 Parabolic loudspeaker
 Room acoustics

References

External links 

 Ear of Dionysius: visiting information, videos and sounds of this cave.
 Grand Central Station: visiting information, videos and sounds of the whispering gallery.
 St Paul's Cathedral: visiting information, videos and sounds of the whispering gallery.

Acoustics
Rooms